Signe Marie Store (born 23 August 1995) is a Norwegian freestyle wrestler.

She qualified for competing in the -69 kg class at the 2016 Summer Olympics in Rio de Janeiro.

Store is the first female wrestler to represent Norway at the Olympics.

References

External links
 

1995 births
Living people
People from Tana, Norway
Norwegian female sport wrestlers
Wrestlers at the 2016 Summer Olympics
Olympic wrestlers of Norway
Sportspeople from Troms og Finnmark
21st-century Norwegian women